Alatna Valley  (sometimes incorrectly spelled Atlanta Valley) is an ice-free valley lying 4 miles (6 km) north of Mount Gran and trending east-northeast for about 10 miles (16 km) along the southeast side of the Convoy Range. It is one of the northernmost of the McMurdo Dry Valleys. Parker Calkin, U.S. geologist, made stratigraphic studies in the valley during the 1960–1961 season. Named by Advisory Committee on Antarctic Names in 1963 for the gasoline tanker  which participated in Operation Deep Freeze 1958–1959 and 1959–1960, and in keeping with other ship names in the Convoy Range.

References

 

Valleys of Victoria Land
McMurdo Dry Valleys